Sreekol Union is a union parishad situated at Sreepur Upazila,  in Magura District, Khulna Division of Bangladesh. There are 23 villages and 14 mouzas in the union.

References

External links
 

Unions of Khulna Division
Unions of Sreepur Upazila
Unions of Magura District